{{DISPLAYTITLE:C3H7NO}}
The molecular formula C3H7NO may refer to:

 Acetone oxime (acetoxime)
 1-Amino-2-propanone
 Dimethylformamide
 Isoxazolidine
 Methylacetamide
 Oxazolidine
 Propionamide